The Mount Pearl Jr. Blades are a Canadian Junior ice hockey club from Mount Pearl, Newfoundland and Labrador.  They are members of the St. John's Junior Hockey League, are a former Junior A team, and won the Don Johnson Cup Maritime Junior B championship in 1986.

History
Prior to 1980, junior hockey in St. John's was for the most part a Juvenile-level recreation league.  Every year, an all-star team was drafted from the city and named the St. John's Jr. Capitals, after their senior team the St. John's Capitals, to compete against teams from across the province for the Veitch Memorial Trophy at either the Junior A or B level.

In 1980, the St. John's Junior Hockey League was organized and a legitimate Junior B league was formed.  The winner of this league, not an all-star team, would represent the city in provincial and inter-provincial events.  One of the founding members of this league was the Mount Pearl Jr. Blades.  The Blades take their name from the Mount Pearl Blades Senior Hockey Team.

In 1986, the Blades would win their league, the Provincial Veitch Memorial Trophy, and go on to win the Don Johnson Cup as Maritime Junior B Champions in Kensington, Prince Edward Island.

In 1989, the entire league would retract by half and the league, including the Blades, made the jump to Junior A.  After two years of the league being overwhelmed at the national level by the champions of other leagues, the league and its teams returned to Junior B.

The 1995-96 season saw the team set a team record for fewest wins in a season, with two.  In 1996–97, the team withdrew from the league to due lack of competitiveness and repeated game forfeitures.  The team returned to the league in 1998–99 and has been successful and competitive ever since.

The Blades would be league champions in 1986, 2003, 2007, 2009, 2018, and 2022  Their only Veitch Memorial Trophy as Newfoundland Champions and Don Johnson Cup as Atlantic Champions would come in 1986.

Season-by-season record

Don Johnson Cup
Eastern Canada Jr B Championships

External links
SJJHL Website

Ice hockey teams in Newfoundland and Labrador
Mount Pearl
Ice hockey clubs established in 1980
1980 establishments in Newfoundland and Labrador